Tim: The Official Biography of Avicii is a 2021 book about Avicii, written by a Swedish writer Måns Mosesson. The book is published by Sphere Books.

History
In April 2022, it was announced that a biography of Avicii has been written by Måns Mosesson after travelling to locations such as Stockholm, Miami, Ibiza, and Los Angeles, where Tim lived and worked.

Reception
The book has been reviewed by The Guardian, The Independent, and Billboard.

References

Avicii
2021 non-fiction books
Sphere Books books